This is a comprehensive discography of Trent Reznor, an American musician, singer, producer, and multi-instrumentalist most famous as the frontman and primary creative force behind the industrial rock band Nine Inch Nails.  Reznor has also been associated with the bands Option 30, Exotic Birds, and Tapeworm, among others.

Though the majority of material released from Reznor has been under the Nine Inch Nails moniker, some material has been credited to Reznor himself, including writing, production, instrumental performances, and vocal contributions.  Reznor has also remixed songs for a number of artists, including David Bowie, Queen, N*E*R*D, and Megadeth.

Trent has released three singles with his band, How to Destroy Angels.  This band features the vocals of Mariqueen Maandig, Reznor's wife and former West Indian Girl frontwoman.  Their first album was released as a free download via the band's website on June 1, 2010; with the single "A Drowning". This was Trent Reznor's first new material since his initial hiatus from Nine Inch Nails, which he later returned to.

Soundtrack work

Films
All music composed together with Atticus Ross, unless otherwise noted.

Television
All music composed together with Atticus Ross.

Video games

Other

Production and writing credits

Remixes

Vocal contributions

Instrumental contributions

See also
Nine Inch Nails discography
 How to Destroy Angels (band)#Discography

References 

General

Specific

External links

Discography
Discographies of American artists
Rock music discographies
Film and television discographies